The Borders Abbeys Way is a long-distance footpath in the Scottish Borders area of Scotland. The theme of the footpath is the ruined Borders abbeys (established by David I of Scotland) along its way: Kelso Abbey, Jedburgh Abbey, Melrose Abbey and Dryburgh Abbey. These abbeys were homes to monks, who lived there between the 12th and 16th centuries. The route also passes through the towns of Hawick and Selkirk, and close to Abbotsford House, the home of Sir Walter Scott. Along the Borders Abbeys Way there are several rivers: Jed Water, River Teviot, River Tweed, Ale Water, and Rule Water.

The route was opened in 2006, and is managed and maintained by Scottish Borders Council. It is now designated as one of Scotland's Great Trails by NatureScot. The route links with four of the other Great Trails: the Cross Borders Drove Road, the Romans and Reivers Route, St Cuthbert's Way and the·Southern Upland Way. About 15,000 people use the path every year, of whom over 2,000 complete the entire route.

Sections of the Walk
Most people choose to do the walk in one day for each segment.

See also
Pennine Way National Trail
James Hutton Trail
Roman Heritage Way
Sir Walter Scott Way

References

External links

Borders Abbeys Way Website
Borders Abbeys Way pages on the Scottish Borders Council website
Borders Abbeys Way route description and map (Walkhighlands).
Visit Scotland: Walking the Borders Abbeys Way
The Long Distance Walkers Association: Borders Abbeys Way
Walking Magazine: "Borders of History"
Britain: "Break for the Borders" Also mention of the Tironsian Abbey in Selkirk

Footpaths in the Scottish Borders
Scotland's Great Trails
Ruined abbeys in the Scottish Borders